New York Wing Civil Air Patrol is the highest echelon of Civil Air Patrol in the state of New York. Headquartered at Westchester County Airport campus in White Plains, New York, New York Wing (NYWG) has 9 primary subordinate units located throughout the state to help it carry out its missions.

Missions
The missions include providing aerospace education and training for all of its members, teaching leadership skills to New York youth, and performing various domestic emergency services for the United States of America in a noncombatant capacity.

Emergency Services
Civil Air Patrol provides emergency services, which includes performing search and rescue and disaster relief missions; as well as assisting in humanitarian aid assignments. CAP also provides Air Force support through conducting light transport, communications support, and low-altitude route surveys. Civil Air Patrol also supports counter-drug missions. 

After September 11 attacks in 2001, New York Wing was activated to support the state by providing some of the first aerial photographs of Ground Zero and by offering support to local agencies.

Cadet Programs
Civil Air Patrol offers a cadet program for youth aged 12 to 21, which includes aerospace education and opportunities, leadership education and training, formal Air Force style drill and ceremonies training, and Emergency Services training. 

New York Wing holds an annual Encampment for the cadet members, eight days where cadets study drill, leadership, and teamwork in a basic training like environment under the mentorship of cadet staff and senior members. New York Wing also holds a Flight Academy for cadets to learn to fly either a powered aircraft or a glider.

Aerospace Education
Civil Air Patrol offers aerospace education for CAP members and the general public, including providing training to the members of CAP, and offering workshops for youth throughout the nation through schools and public aviation events.

Organization

New York Wing is divided into nine groups across the state, with each squadron being assigned as a component of a group based on its geographical location.

See also
New York Air National Guard
New York Guard
New York Naval Militia

External links
New York Wing - Civil Air Patrol

References 

Wings of the Civil Air Patrol
Organizations based in New York (state)
Education in New York (state)
Military in New York (state)
Aviation in New York (state)